Kumru is a Turkish sandwich on a bun, typically with cheese, tomato, and sausage. The name of this street food translates as 'collared dove', and derives from the shape of the sandwich. The original kumru was ring-shaped and covered with sesame seeds. The present one appeared in the mid-20th century, and soon became very popular. The secret of its popularity is in its tasty and soft bread, specially produced by some local bakeries and restaurants with added chickpea sourdough. Some kumru vendors also serve it with pickled cucumbers, hot pepper, mayonnaise and ketchup.

See also
 Pogacha

References

Turkish cuisine